Harold Ridley Hooper (1886, Bury St Edmunds – 1953) was an English architect based in Ipswich, Suffolk.

He was elected ARIBA in 1910, having been articled to John Shewell Corder, and started his own practice in Ipswich in 1912.  He  was a Colonel in the 4th Battalion of the Suffolk Regiment during World War I. He was later Deputy Lord Lieutenant of Suffolk.

His buildings include:
 Electric Palace Cinema, Harwich (1911),
 Butlins Skegness holiday camp (1936) and other designs for Butlins Ltd.
 Belstead House
 Margaret Catchpole Public House, (1936)

References

 
 

1886 births
1953 deaths
20th-century English architects
People from Bury St Edmunds
Architects from Ipswich
British Army personnel of World War I
Suffolk Regiment officers
Associates of the Royal Institute of British Architects